Slobodan Štambuk (born March 1, 1941, in Selca on Brač) is a retired Croatian bishop of the Roman Catholic diocese Hvar.

Biography 
Slobodan Štambuk was ordained on July 3, 1966, in Selca after studying theology in Zadar. 1966 to 1968 he worked in Gornji Humac and Pražnica, before he moved to Hvar. In 1978 he returned to Brač and was a priest in Nerežišća until 1981, and then in Supetar and Škrip until 1989. From 1979 to 1989 he was the editor of the church newspaper Bračka Crkva (The Church of Brač). Štambuk was consecrated as the Bishop of Hvar on March 30, 1989, by archbishop Gabriel Montalvo Higuera. In March 2018, he resigned from this position due to age.

External links 

 Biography on the Website of the Croatian Bishop conference (Croatian)
 

1941 births
Living people
Roman Catholic bishops in Croatia
Bishops of Hvar
Members of the Congregation for the Evangelization of Peoples
Members of the Pontifical Council for the Promotion of the New Evangelisation
People from Selca, Brač